Matt Frawley (born 24 December 1994) is an Australian professional rugby league footballer who plays as a  or  for the Canberra Raiders in the NRL. 

Frawley previously played for the Canterbury-Bankstown Bulldogs in the National Rugby League and the Huddersfield Giants in the Super League.

Background
Frawley was born in Canberra, ACT, Australia. Frawley is of Irish heritage.  

Frawley played his junior rugby league for the Belconnen United Sharks and West Belconnen Warriors, before being signed by the Canberra Raiders.

Playing career

Early career
In 2013 and 2014, Frawley played for the Canberra Raiders' NYC team, captaining the side in 2014. Frawley had doubts about ever making the NRL as Canberra signed Blake Austin. 

Frawley started selling retail clothes in Canberra before signing a 2-year contract with the Canterbury-Bankstown Bulldogs that began in 2015.

2017
In round 5 of the 2017 NRL season, Frawley got the call up from coach Des Hasler and made his NRL debut for Canterbury against the Brisbane Broncos, due to incumbent half Moses Mbye being suspended for one-match. Frawley was named in the number 6 jersey.

In his second game in the NRL, he was originally named in the number 20 jersey, coach Des Hasler moved him onto the bench in place of Raymond Faitala-Mariner. He came on late in the first half in place of injured Brad Abbey, and in the first set of the second half scored a try, his first in the NRL. He also came up with a try assist, with a cut out pass to send Josh Morris over in the corner.

In round 6 against Newcastle Knights, Frawley was named in the number 20 jersey, he was later named on the bench in place of Raymond Faitala-Mariner. Frawley didn't get on the field in the first half, though when Brad Abbey fell down with injury, Frawley came on to the field in the second half. He scored a try. He dummied multiple times and put the Bulldogs in the lead. The Bulldogs went on to win 22-12.

In round 9, Frawley played his former side, Canberra with Canterbury winning the game 16-10. He had to take control as Josh Reynolds got injured, and was ruled out until round 14.

Frawley scored his second career try in Round 11 against the Sydney Roosters, almost completing his team's comeback.

2018
Frawley started the 2018 season as Canterbury's first choice , but was demoted to reserve grade by coach Dean Pay after 2 games. After spending 7 weeks in reserve grade, Frawley was recalled to Canterbury's NRL side for their round 9 game against Brisbane.  On 27 August, Frawley was one of the players announced to be departing the club at the end of the season after his contract was not renewed.
It was announced on 28 October 2018 that Frawley had signed for Huddersfield in the Super League.

2019
On 10 December, it was announced that Frawley had signed a one-year development contract with NRL side Canberra for the 2020 NRL season.

2020
In round 20 of the 2020 NRL season, Frawley made and scored a try on his debut for the Canberra Raiders in the role of five-eighth, against Cronulla-Sutherland in their final game of the 2020 regular season.

2021
Frawley made only five appearances for Canberra in the 2021 NRL season which saw the club finish a disappointing 10th on the table.

2022
Frawley made eight appearances for Canberra in the 2022 NRL season as the club finished 8th on the table and qualified for the finals.  Frawley did not play in either of Canberra's finals matches.

Career statistics

References

External links

Canberra Raiders profile
Huddersfield Giants profile
SL profile
Canterbury-Bankstown Bulldogs profile

1994 births
Living people
Australian people of Irish descent
Australian rugby league players
Australian expatriate sportspeople in England
Canberra Raiders players
Canterbury-Bankstown Bulldogs players
Huddersfield Giants players
Rugby league five-eighths
Rugby league halfbacks
Rugby league players from Canberra